1U may refer to:

 ITA Software (IATA code)
 1U, a rack unit measurement
 1U server; see Pizza box form factor
 RS-1U, a type of K-5 (missile)
 J-1U, a model of Auster Workmaster
 SSH 1U (WA); see Washington State Route 503
 An abbreviation for 1 Utama

See also
U1 (disambiguation)